Kremenchuk Oil Refinery is the largest enterprise for the production of petroleum products in Ukraine. It is located in Kremenchuk, Poltava Oblast. Since 1994 it has been the main branch of PJSC Ukrtatnafta.

Destruction
On April 3, 2022,  Dmytro Lunin, the governor of the Kremenchuk announced that the oil refinery has been "completely destroyed" after a Russian attack. In May, the Russians launched at the destroyed refinery four missiles. Yuriy Vitrenko, the CEO of Naftogaz, said at a June 21 “All oil refining in Ukraine is now shut down due to massive repeated attacks" by the Russians.

References

See also
 Ukrtatnafta
 Tatneft
 List of oil refineries
 Lysychansk Oil Refinery
 Odesa Refinery

Companies established in 1966
Companies of Ukraine by city
Economy of Poltava Oblast
Economy of Ukraine by city
Kremenchuk
1961 in Ukraine
1966 in Ukraine
History of Poltava Oblast
Oil refineries in Ukraine
Privat Group
Companies based in Lviv Oblast
Buildings and structures destroyed during the 2022 Russian invasion of Ukraine
Oil refineries in the Soviet Union